Punjab Agricultural University Stadium is a multipurpose stadium located in Punjab Agricultural University Campus, Ludhiana, Punjab. The stadium and owned by Punjab Agricultural University.

The stadium has facilities for cricket and football, as well as an astroturf field for hockey. In addition, there is a swimming pool and a velodrome.

There are also facilities for indoor sports such as  basketball, badminton, gymnastics, handball, volleyball, lawn tennis, table tennis, weight lifting, and Kabbadi. The Ground has also hosted 10 Ranji including a final in 1993 and one Irani Trophy matches from 1987 to 1999  and 10 List A matches.

References

 
Football venues in Punjab, India
Sports venues in Punjab, India
Buildings and structures in Ludhiana
Cricket grounds in Punjab, India
University sports venues in India
Field hockey venues in India
1989 establishments in Punjab, India
Sports venues completed in 1989
20th-century architecture in India